Dávid Bor (born 10 December 1994) is a Hungarian footballer who plays as a defender.

Club statistics

Updated to games played as of 11 March 2020.

References 
MLSZ

1994 births
Living people
Footballers from Budapest
Hungarian footballers
Association football forwards
Paksi FC players
Balmazújvárosi FC players
Dorogi FC footballers
Soproni VSE players
Soroksár SC players
Nemzeti Bajnokság I players
FK Csíkszereda Miercurea Ciuc players
Liga II players
Nemzeti Bajnokság II players
Békéscsaba 1912 Előre footballers
Hungarian expatriate footballers
Hungarian expatriate sportspeople in Romania
Expatriate footballers in Romania